The Boonton Public Schools is a comprehensive community public school district that serves students in pre-kindergarten through twelfth grade from Boonton, in Morris County, New Jersey, United States.

As of the 2020–21 school year, the district, comprised of three schools, had an enrollment of 1,457 students and 132.8 classroom teachers (on an FTE basis), for a student–teacher ratio of 11.0:1.

The district is classified by the New Jersey Department of Education as being in District Factor Group "I", the second-highest of eight groupings. District Factor Groups organize districts statewide to allow comparison by common socioeconomic characteristics of the local districts. From lowest socioeconomic status to highest, the categories are A, B, CD, DE, FG, GH, I and J.

The district's high school serves students from Boonton and also those from Lincoln Park, who attend as part of a sending/receiving relationship with the Lincoln Park Public Schools, with Lincoln Park students accounting for a majority of students at the high school. The two districts have sought to sever the more-than-50-year-old relationship, citing cost savings that could be achieved by both districts and complaints by Lincoln Park that it is granted only one seat on the Boonton Public Schools' Board of Education, less than the number of seats that would be allocated based on the percentage of students of population. In April 2006, the Commissioner of the New Jersey Department of Education rejected the request.

Schools
Schools in the district (with 2020–21 enrollment statistics from the National Center for Education Statistics) are:
Elementary schools 
School Street School with 258 students in grades PreK-2
Alison Schessler, Principal
John Hill School with 537 students in grades 3–8
Sara Brogan, Principal for grades 6-8
Thomas Valle, Principal for grades 3-5
High school
Boonton High School with 636 students in grades 9–12
Jason Klebez, Principal
Debra Ballway, Vice Principal
Edward Forman, Vice Principal

Administration
Core members of the district's administration are:
Robert Presuto, Superintendent
Steven Gardberg, Business Administrator / Board Secretary

Board of education
The district's board of education is comprised of nine members who set policy and oversee the fiscal and educational operation of the district through its administration; an additional member represents Lincoln Park. As a Type II school district, the board's trustees are elected directly by voters to serve three-year terms of office on a staggered basis, with three seats up for election each year held (since 2012) as part of the November general election. The board appoints a superintendent to oversee the district's day-to-day operations and a business administrator to supervise the business functions of the district.

References

External links
Boonton Public Schools
 
Boonton Public Schools, National Center for Education Statistics

Boonton, New Jersey
Lincoln Park, New Jersey
New Jersey District Factor Group I
School districts in Morris County, New Jersey